Tsougria, Tsoungria, or Tsougkria is a Greek island in the western part of the Sporades. , it had no resident population, as it is a protected natural habitat. It is administratively part of the municipality of Skiathos and is located southeast of the island. The island has several beaches that are popular with yachts and round-island trips.

References

External links
Official website of Municipality of Skiathos 
Tsougkria on GTP Travel Pages 

Landforms of the Sporades
Skiathos
Islands of Thessaly
Nature reserves